Maserati A6 were a series of grand tourers, racing sports cars and single seaters made by Maserati of Italy between 1947 and 1956. They were named for Alfieri Maserati (one of the Maserati brothers, founders of Maserati) and for their straight-six engine.

The 1.5-litre straight-six was named A6 TR (Testa Riportata for its detachable cylinder head), and was based on the pre-war Maserati 6CM and produced . It first appeared in the A6 Sport or Tipo 6CS/46, a barchetta prototype, developed by Ernesto Maserati and Alberto Massimino. This became the A6 1500 Pinin Farina-designed two-door berlinetta, first shown at the 1947 Salon International de l'Auto in Geneva (59 made) and the spider shown at the 1948 Salone dell'automobile di Torino (2 made).

A 2-litre, 120-horsepower straight-six was used in the A6 GCS two-seater, "G" denoting Ghisa, cast iron block, and "CS" denoting Corsa Sport. Also called Monofaro ("single headlamp"), the 580 kg single-seater and cycle-winged racing version first appeared at Modena 1947 by Luigi Villoresi and Alberto Ascari, and won the 1948 Italian Championship by Giovanni Bracco.  Fifteen cars were made 1947-1953, of these being two-seaters (630 kg).

The A6G were a series of two-door coupés and spyders by Zagato, Pinin Farina, Pietro Frua, Ghia, Bertone, Carrozzeria Allemano and Vignale. These had alloy engine blocks. The Maserati A6 was typically fitted with 16-inch Borrani Wheels and Pirelli Stella Bianca Tyres.

Introduction
The acronyms identifying each model are interpreted as follows:

 A6: the name of the series: A for Alfieri (Maserati), 6 for six cylinders.
 G: «Ghisa», cast iron, the engine block material.
 CS: «Corsa Sport», for racing sports car.
 CM: «Corsa Monoposto», for single seater racing car.

"1500" or "2000" indicate the rounded up total engine displacement in cubic centimetres; while suffixes such as "53" denote the year of the type's introduction.

A6 Sport
Ernesto Maserati started work on the Tipo 6CS/46, also called A6 Sport or A6CS, in 1945. Designed together with Alberto Massimino, two prototype barchettas had been completed in late 1946 for the 1947 racing season. The 6CS/46 used the  straight-six engines from the pre-war Maserati 6CM. These took the first two places at Circuito di Piacenza on 11 May 1947, driven by Giulio Barbieri and Mario Angiolini. It is likely that the "Maserati 6CS 1500" which won at Voghera in October 1946 with Luigi Villoresi at the wheel is also one of this type.

A6GCS

In 1947 Maserati developed a two-seater sports racing car powered by a 2.0-litre engine called A6GCS. At first it produced , but it was further upgraded in 1952.

A6 1500

The A6 1500 (officially 1500 Gran Turismo) grand tourer was Maserati's first production road car. Development was started in 1941 by the Maserati brothers, but it was halted as priorities shifted to wartime production and was only completed after the war.

The first chassis, bodied by Pinin Farina, debuted at the Geneva Salon International de l'Auto in March 1947. This first prototype was a two-door, two-seat, three-window berlinetta with triple square portholes on its fully integrated front wings, a tapered cabin and futuristic hidden headlamps. The car was put into low volume production, and most received Pinin Farina coachwork. For production Pinin Farina toned down the prototype's design, switching to conventional headlamps; soon after a second side window was added. Later cars received a different 2+2 fastback body style. A Pinin Farina Convertibile was shown at the 1948 Salone dell'automobile di Torino, and two were made; one car was also given a distinctive coupé Panoramica body by Zagato in 1949, featuring an extended greenhouse. Sixty-one A6 1500s were built between 1947 and 1950, when it began to be gradually replaced by the A6G 2000.

The A6 1500 was powered by a  inline-six (bore 66 mm, stroke 72.5 mm), with a single overhead camshaft and a single Weber carburettor, producing ; starting from 1949 some cars were fitted with triple carburettors. Top speed varied from  depending on gearing and bodywork. The chassis was built out of tubular and sheet steel sections. Suspension was by double wishbones at the front and solid axle at the rear, with Houdaille hydraulic dampers and coil springs on all four corners.

A6G 2000

The improved A6G 2000 (officially 2000 Gran Turismo) began to replace the A6 1500 from 1950. The chassis retained the same measurements of the A6 1500, but the rear axle was now sprung on semi elliptic leaf springs.

The model debuted at the 1950 Turin Motor Show, wearing Pinin Farina coachwork. Just sixteen cars were built, all between 1950 and 1951. Nine received 2+2 fastback bodies by Pinin Farina; Frua built five convertibles and one coupé; lastly one got Vignale coupé bodywork designed by Giovanni Michelotti.

A6GCM

Maserati A6GCM (1951–53) were twelve 2-litre single-seater («M» for monoposto) racing cars (160-190 bhp), developed by Gioacchino Colombo and built by Medardo Fantuzzi.  The A6 SSG (1953) was a GCM-revision pointing to the Maserati 250F. It won the 1953 Italian Grand Prix driven by Juan Manuel Fangio.

A6GCS/53

To compete in the World Sportscar Championship, the A6GCS/53 was developed in 1953. The engine was improved to produce . A6GCS/53s were typically spiders, initially designed by Colombo and then refined by Medardo Fantuzzi and Celestino Fiandri. Fifty-two were made. That number includes four berlinettas designed by Aldo Brovarone at Pinin Farina and one spider, their final design of a Maserati for the next five decades, on a commission by Rome dealer Guglielmo Dei who had acquired six chassis. Vignale also made one spider. In 1955, Guglielmo Dei bought two more chassis, numbers 2109 and 2110, and employed Carrozzeria Frua to create two open-top models. Those cars received A6G/54-sourced engines with racing modifications like a dry sump lubrication.

This car won the Polyphony Digital Award (an award given by Kazunori Yamauchi, creator of Gran Turismo game series) at the Pebble Beach Concours d'Elegance in 2014 and has been featured in the 2013 mobile game CSR Classics, 2016 game Forza Horizon 3 as a special barn-find car, as well as the  2017 game Forza Motorsport 7  and 2018 game Forza Horizon 4.

A6G/54

After a two-year hiatus at the 1954 Mondial de l'Automobile in Paris Maserati launched a new grand tourer, the A6G 2000 Gran Turismo—commonly known as A6G/54 to distinguish it from its predecessor.

Four body styles were offered: a three-box Carrozzeria Allemano coupé (21 made, designed by Michelotti), a coupé and a Gran Sport Spyder by Frua (respectively 6 and 12 made); and a competition-oriented fastback by Zagato (20 made) with a single Zagato spider, chassis 2101, presented in 1955 at Geneva. Total production between 1954 and 1956 amounted to 60 units. An A6G/54 Zagato chassis 2155 received a unique coupé bodystyle, after being crashed on a test drive by Gianni Zagato. Distinguished by non-fastback rear-end and 'eyelids' over the headlights. It is also one of only two with a 'double bubble' roof.

References

A6
1940s cars
1950s cars
Grand tourers